The Doll is a 2015 Chinese horror film directed by Liu Chongchong. It was released in China on December 18, 2015.

Cast
Xu Dongmei
Zhang Xu
Yang Yang
Xie Yuan

Reception
The film has grossed  in China.

References

2010s supernatural horror films
2015 horror films
Chinese supernatural horror films
2010s Mandarin-language films